The Allison TF41 (Company designations RB.168-62 and Model 912) is a low-bypass turbofan engine.

Design and development
The TF41 was jointly developed by Allison Engine Company and Rolls-Royce from the latter's RB.168-25R Spey. Allison manufactured the TF41 under license, while Rolls-Royce supplied parts common to existing Speys. The TF41 was developed for use in the LTV A-7D Corsair II for the USAF, and the US Navy's A-7E. Between 1968 and 1983, a total of 1,440 TF41s were delivered.

Applications

 LTV A-7 Corsair II (USAF -D/-K and US Navy -E models),

Specifications (TF41-A-1)

See also

References

External links

 Rolls-Royce.com Spey page
 globalsecurity.org TF41 page

Low-bypass turbofan engines
1960s turbofan engines
TF41